Nicholas de Aston was an English medieval college fellow and university chancellor.

Nicholas de Aston was at The Queen's College, Oxford and achieved a Doctor of Divinity degree.   He was Chancellor of the University of Oxford between 1360 and 1363.

References

Year of birth unknown
Year of death unknown
Fellows of The Queen's College, Oxford
Chancellors of the University of Oxford
14th-century English people
14th-century English writers